Oksana Shmachkova (born 20 June 1981 in Rayevskaya) is retired a Russian women's international footballer who played as a defender. She was a member of the Russia women's national football team. She was part of the team at the 2003 FIFA Women's World Cup as well as UEFA Women's Euro 2001 and 2009. On club level she played for various clubs in Russia including FC Energy Voronezh and WFC Rossiyanka.

References

1981 births
Living people
Russian women's footballers
Russia women's international footballers
2003 FIFA Women's World Cup players
Women's association football defenders
WFC Rossiyanka players
FC Energy Voronezh players
Sportspeople from Krasnodar Krai
Russian Women's Football Championship players